The 9 Mile Music Festival, also known as the Bob Marley Festival, Bob Fest, Marley Fest and Caribbean Festival, is an annual music event which began in 1993 in Miami. 9 Mile was pioneered by Bob Marley's mother, Cedella Marley Booker, to pay tribute to the legacy of her late son, and his messages of peace, love and unity. The festival maintains a tradition of collecting canned goods upon admission, to continue efforts to give back to the community. Donations go towards feeding the less fortunate in South Florida and the Caribbean. Over 2 million cans have been donated over the years.

The festival 

The one-day music festival has taken place every year since 1993.  The festival is largely focused on reggae, but also incorporates other music genres like dance, hip hop, rock and R&B.

Bob Marley's children Ziggy Marley, Stephen Marley, Julian Marley, Ky-mani Marley and Damian Marley have performed at many of the editions. Other performers have included Carlos Santana, Lauryn Hill, Hootie & the Blowfish, Erykah Badu, Burning Spear, Buju Banton, Sizzla Kalonji, Capleton, Pitbull, 2 Chainz, Future, T.I., Tarrus Riley, Konshens, Machel Montano, Diana King, SOJA, Slightly Stoopid, Thievery Corporation, Sean Paul, Shaggy, Mavado, DMX, India Arie, Inner Circle and Major Lazer.

The festival offers an array of booths for artist merchandise, local vendors and academics to share their goods and services. Booths offer food and drinks from may different cultures including Jamaican, Chinese, Spanish and American food as well as a wide variety of vegetarian and vegan dishes.

The 24th Annual 9 Mile Music Festival will also showcase a holistic village which will feature various booths for acupuncture, massages, yoga, body painting and a drum circle on the beach. Nutritionists and life coaches will be offering advice and services for those interested.

History 

Conceived and created in 1993 by Cedella Marley Booker, the mother of Jamaican reggae singer, songwriter, musician, and guitarist Bob Marley, the festival has been held every year since. The festival is organized by 9 Mile Entertainment, a business run by Cedella Marley Booker's son Richard Booker. The 9 Mile Music Festival was envisioned by Cedella and Richard to serve the Bob Marley and the Waliers Fan Club in honor Bob Marley's memory in song and philanthropy.

The spirit of the festival is that by working together people can make big differences in helping their communities. As part of the entrance fee, attendees bring four canned goods on the day of the event – or make a financial donation as part of the admission to the event. The donations are collected and distributed to charities to help feed the needy in the Miami area.

The festival became known early on as the Marley Fest because of its founder and the inspiration drawn from Cedella's late son with Bob Marley's sons performing each year.

The festival has gone through a series of name changes. These include the Bob Marley Festival, Marley Fest and The Caribbean Festival.

In 2011, the festival was rebranded as the 9 Mile Music Festival. The name derives from Nine Mile, a village in Saint Ann Parish, Jamaica where Bob Marley was born, began his musical career and found inspiration for many of his songs. Nine Mile is home to the Bob Marley Mausoleum, which showcases many of his awards, guitars and photographs. It has become a tourist attraction in Jamaica and is also the place where both Cedella and Richard Booker are buried.

Charity 

In honor of Bob Marley's philanthropic efforts during his lifetime, the Festival, in coordination with Cedella Marley Booker's philanthropic organization, Movement of Jah People, collects four canned goods or financial donations from every attendee as part of admission. The events have collected more than three million canned goods in its 22 years. Goods are donated to local and international charities and shelters in South Florida and Jamaica.

2011 lineup 
 Date: March 12, 2011
 Venue: Bayfront Park, Miami
 Lineup: Stephen Marley, Damian Marley, Julian Marley, Ky-Mani Marley, Christopher Ellis, Slightly Stoopid, Inner Circle, Major Lazer, Thievery Corporation, DJ Mala, DJ Hatcha & DJ Juan Basshead.

2012 lineup 
 Date: March 3, 2012
 Venue: Virginia Key Beach Park
 Lineup: Stephen Marley, Damian Marley, Julian Marley, Capelton, Burning Spear, Wale, Richie Spice, Melanie Fiona, Collie Buddz & Cocoa Tea.

2013 lineup 
 Date: March 2, 2013
 Venue: Virginia Key Beach Park
 Lineup: Stephen Marley, Damian Marley, Julian Marley, Capelton, Mavado, 2 Chains & Future.

2014 lineup 

 Date: February 15, 2014
 Venue: Miami Dade County Fair & Expo Center
 Lineup: Stephen Marley, Damian Marley, Julian Marley, Sean Paul, Lauryn Hill, Mavado, Ken Y, Chronixx, Mavado, Alika & Nueva Alianza.

2015 lineup 

 Date: February 14, 2015
 Venue: Dade County Fairgrounds
 Lineup: Stephen Marley, Damian Marley, Julian Marley, Tanya Stephens, The Green, Capleton, Jo Mersa Marley, SOJA and Jesse Royal.

2016 lineup 

 Date: February 27, 2016
 Venue: Virginia Key Beach Park
 Lineup: Stephen Marley, Damian Marley, Julian Marley, Skip Marley, Nas, Capleton, Konshens, Mr. Cheeks, Protoje, Kabaka Pyramid, Styleon, K CAMP, Locos Por Juana and Shacia Marley.

2017 lineup 
 Date: March 11, 2017
 Venue: Virginia Key Beach Park
 Lineup: Stephen Marley, Damian Marley, Julian Marley, Capleton, DMX, Charly Black, Sizzla, Matamba, Kreesha Turner, DJ Jahstream, DJ Mighty Crown & Lance-O of Kulcha Shok.

2019 lineup 

 Date: March 9, 2019
 Venue: Virginia Key Beach Park
 Lineup: Nas, Shabba Ranks, Sizzla, Busy Signal, Capleton, Spice, Barrington Levy & DJ Mighty Crown

See also 

 List of reggae festivals
 Nas
 Bob Marley
 Cedella Marley Booker
 Bob Marley and the Wailers
 Reggae
 Bob Marley Museum
 Virginia Key Beach Park

References 

 Bob Marley's mother dies Music-news.com
 Bob Marley's Family Settles Trademark Lawsuit With Singer's Half-Brother
 9 Mile Music Festival Reggae Vibe
 Nine Mile Music Festival's 2014 Lineup: Lauryn Hill, Three Marleys, Five Others Miami New Times
 9 Mile Music Festival 2015: One love, four Marleys SouthFlorida.com

External links 
 9 Mile Music Festival official site

Music festivals in Miami
Reggae festivals in the United States
1993 establishments in Florida
Music festivals established in 1993